David Michael Mirra (April 4, 1974 – February 4, 2016) was an American BMX rider who also competed in rallycross racing. He set the record for most medals in BMX Freestyle at the X Games (later tied by Scotty Cranmer) and earned at least one BMX medal at the event in all but one year from the competition's inception in 1995 until 2009. He also competed for several years with the Subaru Rally Team USA as a rallycross driver. Mirra rode for and was fully sponsored by Haro Bikes from the mid-1990s until he started his own bike company. He was a member of the team which won the 2014 Race Across America four-person male (under 50) category. Mirra died by suicide on February 4, 2016. He was inducted into the BMX Hall of Fame on June 11, 2016.

Early life
Mirra was born on April 4, 1974, in Chittenango, New York. He graduated from California State Polytechnic University, Pomona (Cal Poly Pomona).

In the 1990s, Mirra's brother, Tim, moved to Greenville, North Carolina, to attend East Carolina University. Dave moved to Greenville soon after. Fellow professional BMX rider Ryan Nyquist moved in with Tim. Mirra and Nyquist became quick friends and would build and ride ramps together. Greenville is now home to over twenty professional BMX riders. This gave Greenville the nickname "Protown" in the BMX community.

Career
While still living in Chittenango, Mirra joined the Haro Bikes BMX team in 1987, at the age of 13. Video producers Plywood Hoods featured him in their videos in 1988. Mirra gained a sponsorship from Vision Street Wear in 1989. He was also sponsored by GT Bicycles through 1991, and then joined Hoffman Bikes in 1992 before re-signing with Haro in 1994.

Mirra turned professional in 1992. He won at least one medal at the X Games in every year from 1995 through 2009, with the exception of 2006, after being injured during a practice run. In 2005, Mirra won the Best Male Action Sports Athlete ESPY Award. He tied Tony Hawk and Joe Parsons as the fastest to reach 14 X Games medals, and his 24 total medals at the X Games stood as a record until 2013. He shares the record for most gold medals at the Summer X Games, with a total of 14 (tied with Bob Burnquist and Jamie Bestwick). He retired from BMX riding in 2011.

From 2008 through 2013, Mirra competed in rallying and rallycross as a member of Subaru Rally Team USA. He had a career-best fourth-place finish during the 2013 Global RallyCross Championship. Mirra became interested in Ironman competitions, competing in his first triathlon in March 2013. He qualified for the 2014 Ironman 70.3 World Championship.

Mirra's success took him to numerous outlets besides riding his bike, such as hosting two seasons of MTV's Real World/Road Rules Challenge. He is featured in the Dave Mirra Freestyle BMX video game series and more recently appeared in the 2009 video game Colin McRae: Dirt 2. He published a photo-biography titled "Mirra Images", and was once one of People magazine's "50 Hottest Bachelors". In the mid-2000s, Mirra signed an endorsement deal with DC Shoes after leaving Adidas. With his friends in 2007, he started his own bike company called MirraCo.

Personal life and death
Mirra and his wife, Lauren, had two daughters. Mirra contracted bacterial meningitis in 2010. He recovered before resuming rally racing.

On February 4, 2016, Mirra died from an apparent self-inflicted gunshot wound to the head in Greenville, North Carolina, at the age of 41. Authorities responded to a reported suicide and discovered his body inside his black Ford F-150 Raptor. He had reportedly been visiting friends in the area. Allen M. Thomas, the mayor of Greenville, called Mirra "a great friend and wonderful human being."

Mirra was posthumously diagnosed with chronic traumatic encephalopathy (CTE). In addition to the "countless" concussions he suffered during his career, his skull was fractured when he was hit by a car at 19 years old, and he also competed in boxing as an amateur. He became the first action sports star to be diagnosed with the neurodegenerative disease.

Mirra's wife chose to support several charitable causes in her late husband's memory, including CTE research, Road 2 Recovery Foundation, and More Than Sport.

City officials in Greenville, North Carolina, are working on plans to create an action sports park to honor Mirra's legacy. The first phase would include both skate and BMX facilities.

Racing record

Complete FIA World Rallycross Championship results

Supercar

Complete Global RallyCross Championship results

Supercar

References

External links 

 
 Online photo-biography
 OXY Nation Website, Dave Mirra Video
 The Last Days of Dave Mirra - Matt Higgins, Outside, February 17, 2016

California State Polytechnic University, Pomona alumni
1974 births
2016 deaths
BMX riders
X Games athletes
American male cyclists
Global RallyCross Championship drivers
People from Chittenango, New York
Sportspeople with chronic traumatic encephalopathy
Suicides by firearm in North Carolina
World Rallycross Championship drivers
2016 suicides
Cyclists from New York (state)